The Scheme for Full Employment is a novel by the English author Magnus Mills, published in 2003 by Flamingo.

Plot introduction
The scheme referred to in the title involves the driving of "UniVans" from depot to depot picking up and unloading cargo - the cargo being replacement parts for UniVans. "Gloriously self-perpetuating, the scheme was designed to give an honest day’s wage for an honest day’s labour", "the envy of the world: the greatest undertaking ever conceived by man". The novel is a satire of labour relations and describes how the scheme is brought to the brink of disaster.

Reception
According to aggregated reviews at Complete Review, the novel received mixed reviews with no consensus; the website concluded it was a "decent trifle".

References

External links
 Entry on the novel at Complete Review, with links to and quotes from numerous reviews.

2003 British novels
British satirical novels
Flamingo books
Full employment